Orientozeuzera is a genus of moths in the family Cossidae.

Species
 Orientozeuzera aeglospila (Turner, 1915)
 Orientozeuzera brechlini Yakovlev, 2011 
 Orientozeuzera caudata (Joicey et Talbot, 1916)
 Orientozeuzera celebensis (Roepke, 1957)
 Orientozeuzera halmahera Yakovlev, 2011 
 Orientozeuzera meyi Yakovlev, 2011 
 Orientozeuzera postexcisa (Hampson, 1893)
 Orientozeuzera quieta Turner, 1932
 Orientozeuzera rhabdota (Jordan, 1932)
 Orientozeuzera roepkei Yakovlev, 2011 
 Orientozeuzera shiva Yakovlev, 2011 
 Orientozeuzera sympatrica Yakovlev, 2011

References

Natural History Museum Lepidoptera generic names catalog

Zeuzerinae